Azarbon-e Sofla (also Romanized as Āzārbon-e Soflá; also known as Āzarbon and Āzārbon) is a village in Shabkhus Lat Rural District, Rankuh District, Amlash County, Gilan Province, Iran. At the 2006 census, its population was 208, in 58 families.

References 

Populated places in Amlash County